Taucher (German: diver) may refer to:

 "Der Taucher", a ballad by Friedrich Schiller written in 1797
 DJ Taucher, German trance DJ

People with the surname
 Gunnar Taucher (1886–1941), Finnish architect